Jean-Max Bellerive (born 1958) is a Haitian politician and former Prime Minister of Haiti. He resigned on 14 May 2011.

Biography

Personal life
Bellerive was born in Port-au-Prince in 1958. As the son of a prominent doctor, he left Haiti at a very young age to study in Switzerland, France, and Belgium. With a degree in Political Science and International Relations, Bellerive returned to Haiti in 1986, just before the overthrow of Jean-Claude Duvalier. He is married, and has two daughters.

Prime Minister of Haiti
Haitian President René Préval, following the orders of a senate resolution, nominated Bellerive on 30 October 2009, to replace former Prime Minister Michèle Pierre-Louis. A day before the nomination, on 29 October 2009, 18 senators of a 29-member senate had voted to dismiss Pierre-Louis on charges that she was performing poorly in leading Haiti's economic recovery efforts in the wake of the destructive 2008 hurricane season.

On 14 May 2011, Bellerive resigned as Prime Minister, so as to allow the country's new president, Michel Martelly, to choose his own prime minister. Martelly selected Daniel Gérard Rouzier to succeed Bellerive. However, the parliament rejected Mr Rouzier.

References

External links

Canadian International Development Agency: Jean-Max Bellerive biography 

Prime Ministers of Haiti
1958 births
Living people
Lespwa politicians
People from Port-au-Prince
21st-century Haitian politicians